Christopher Kalec (born April 7, 1980) is a former Canadian diver. Born in Montreal and raised in Laval, Quebec, he competed in the men's 10 metre platform events at the 2000 and 2004 Summer Olympics.

References

External links

1980 births
Living people
Canadian male divers
Divers at the 2000 Summer Olympics
Divers at the 2004 Summer Olympics
Olympic divers of Canada
Sportspeople from Laval, Quebec
Divers from Montreal